Elizabeth Nicole Halseth (née Schworak; born February 5, 1983) is an American politician. She was a Republican member of the Nevada Senate from November 2010 until February 2012. Halseth is the youngest woman in Nevada to ever have been elected to the Nevada Legislature. She unsuccessfully ran for a seat in the Nevada Senate in 2018.

Early life and education
Elizabeth Nicole Schworak was born in Oregon in 1983, where she was raised by her mother Candy. She graduated from North Salem High School in Salem, Oregon in 2001. She moved to Nevada in 2006. She earned her psychology degree from Corban University in 2014.

Career
Halseth began her political career by running for the Nevada Assembly. However, at the last minute, she decided to shift her campaign goals on the Nevada Senate. Her successful campaign has been called "unlikely." During the primary campaign, Halseth, the more conservative candidate, defeated Dennis Nolan. Halseth released a message left by Nolan on the voicemail of Jaime Anderson Lawes, previous wife of Gordon Lawes, and sister of a sixteen-year-old girl he (Lawes) was accused of raping. Gordon Lawes had been sentenced to a ten-year prison sentence, and Nolan left the message to say it would be "very financially beneficial" if Jaime would "tell the truth" about the rape. The release of this message has been blamed for the failure of Nolan's campaign, and cited as a contributing factor to Halseth's success. She then went on to defeat Benny Yerushalmi, her millionaire opponent in the general election. While a Senator, Halseth was a member of the Senate Revenue Committee, Senate Commerce, Labor and Energy Committee, and the Senate Transportation Committee.

Halseth announced her resignation from office on February 17, 2012, citing issues with balancing performance of her senatorial duties with being a single mother. She also wrote in her letter of resignation that she will likely seek employment outside of Nevada due to issues with finding employment. Her resignation followed criticism that she was missing meetings and not returning telephone calls. Her then-husband Daniel Halseth was later indicted on two felony counts: one of coercion and one of battery; he was also indicted on one misdemeanor count of open and gross lewdness. She unsuccessfully re-ran for a seat in the Nevada Senate in 2018.

Personal life 
In May 2012 after her February resignation from the Senate, Halseth appeared in Maxim's "Hot 100" photo contest appearing in a bikini. Halseth did not win the "Hot 100" contest but was later profiled by Maxim in October 2012 with an additional photoshoot.

Halseth married Daniel Halseth on March 16, 2001. In October 2011, Daniel was arrested over gross and lewd behavior during their fight over his suspicion of her having an affair, based solely on her accusations, and he then later filed divorce against her in November. Rumors of her affair and her ex-husband's status as a sex-offender ultimately lead to her resignation as senator. She later moved to Alaska and married Tiger Helgelion, the man her husband accused her of having an affair with.

In April 2021, Halseths's daughter, Sierra, and her boyfriend, Aaron Guerrero, were arrested in Salt Lake City for Elizabeth Halseth's ex-husband's murder in Las Vegas. Daniel Halseth's body was dismembered and burned during the killing. Both were sentenced to 22 years to life in prison in October 20, 2022 after pleading guilty on May 25, 2022.

References

External links 
 
 Nevada legislative biography

Republican Party Nevada state senators
1983 births
Living people
Politicians from Portland, Oregon
Women state legislators in Nevada
North Salem High School (Salem, Oregon) alumni
Corban University alumni
21st-century American women